Parashu is the Sanskrit word for a battle-axe, which can be wielded with one or both hands.

Construction
The parashu could be double-edge bladed or single-edge bladed with a spike on the non cutting edge. It usually measures between 3 – 5 feet though some are as long as 7 feet. The parashu is usually made of iron or wootz steel. The cutting edge is broader than the edge which is attached to the haft. The haft is often tied with a leather sheet to provide a good grip.

Hinduism
The parashu named Vidyudabhi is the weapon of the god Shiva who gave it to Parashurama, the sixth avatar of Vishnu, whose name means "Rama with the axe" and also taught him its mastery. Parashurama was the guru of Dronacharya, the guru who the epic Mahabharata. Instructed Bhishma and Karna also took instruction in weaponry Karna was only one who got all knowledge of weapons from Parashurama that Shiva has taught to Parshuram, Parashuram was known to have terrible temper, having lost his father to the wicked Kshatriya Kartavirya Arjuna (not to be confused with Arjuna of Mahabharata). Parashurama's weapon had supernatural powers. It had four cutting edges, one on each end of the blade head and one on each end of the shaft.

The parashu was known as the most lethal close combat weapon of the epics. It is one of the weapons of Shiva, Parashurama, and Durga and is still depicted on their idols throughout India. It is also one of the weapons of Ganesha, and the main weapon of Sahadeva and Shakuni.

Legend
The regional Hindu creation myth of Kerala is often attributed to the parashu of Parashurama. According to tradition, Parashurama was offered boons by both Varuna and Bhudevi, the deities who personify the ocean and the earth, respectively. He is stated to have travelled to Kanyakumari, the southernmost tip of the Indian mainland, and thrown his axe northward, recovering a swathe of land from the ocean, which would become Kerala.

References

Weapons in Hindu mythology
Axes
Ancient weapons
Indian melee weapons
Weapons of India